Uroplatus is a genus of geckos, commonly referred to as leaf-tail geckos or flat-tailed geckos, which are endemic to Madagascar and its coastal islands, such as Nosy Be. They are nocturnal, insectivorous lizards found exclusively in primary and secondary forest.

Etymology
The generic name, Uroplatus, is a Latinization of two Greek words: "ourá" (οὐρά) meaning "tail" and "platys" (πλατύς) meaning "flat".

Description
Geckos of the genus Uroplatus are nocturnal and arboreal. Larger species of Uroplatus are distinguished among geckos in having the largest number of marginal teeth among all living amniotes. Other rare apomorphic character states include multiple inscriptional ribs, restriction of autotomy planes, and finger-like diverticula of the lungs.

All Uroplatus species have highly cryptic colouration, which acts as camouflage, most being grayish-brown to black or greenish-brown with various markings resembling tree bark. There are two variations of this camouflage: leaf form, and bark form.  The leaf form is present in a number of small-bodied species. All other forms blend in well with tree bark upon which they rest during the day.  Some of these tree bark forms have developed a flap of skin, running the length of the body, known as a "dermal flap", which they lay against the tree during the day, scattering shadows, and making their outline practically invisible. These geckos bear a resemblance to geckos of the genera Phyllurus and Saltuarius of Australia. This is an example of convergent evolution.

The skull of Uroplatus is strongly ossified, with an extremely high tooth count and incipient secondary palate.

Ecology

Uroplatus geckos are exclusively nocturnal. The larger species spend most of the daylight hours hanging vertically on tree trunks, head down, resting, while the smaller leaf tailed geckos (U. phantasticus, U. ebenaui, U. finiavana, U. malama, U. fiera, U. fotsivava, and U. kelirambo) spend more time in bushes and small trees imitating twigs and leaves. They are all insectivores.

During their breeding season, female Uroplatus lay from 2–4 eggs depending on species and conditions.

Captivity
Uroplatus are found in the herpetology and pet trade, but rarely.  Most are threatened by deforestation and habitat loss. The difficulty in diagnosing between species has led to accidental exportation of both threatened and undescribed species.

Threats
Habitat destruction and deforestation in Madagascar is the primary threat to the future of Uroplatus geckos as well as collection for the pet trade. The World Wide Fund for Nature (WWF) lists all of the Uroplatus species on their "Top ten most wanted species list" of animals threatened by illegal wildlife trade, because of it "being captured and sold at alarming rates for the international pet trade".  It is a CITES Appendix 2 protected animal.

Taxonomy
The genus Uroplatus has had a complex taxonomic history. A detailed study from 2013 suggested there were at least 11 undescribed cryptic species in the genus, several of which have been described since its publication.

Species

The following 21 species are recognised.

Uroplatus alluaudi  Mocquard, 1894 – northern leaf-tail gecko
Uroplatus ebenaui (Boettger, 1879) – spearpoint leaf-tail gecko
Uroplatus fangorn Ratsoavina, Ranjanaharisoa, Glaw, Raselimanana, Rakotoarison, Vieites, Hawlitschek, Vences, & Scherz, 2020
Uroplatus fetsy Ratsoavina, Scherz, Tolley, Raselimanana, Glaw & Vences, 2019
Uroplatus fiera Ratsoavina, Ranjanaharisoa, Glaw, Raselimanana, Miralles & Vences, 2015
Uroplatus fimbriatus (Schneider, 1797) – common leaf-tail gecko
Uroplatus finaritra Ratsoavina, Raselimanana, Scherz, Rakotoarison, Razafindraibe, Glaw & Vences, 2019
Uroplatus finiavana Ratsoavina, Louis, Crottini, Randrianiaina, Glaw & Vences, 2011
Uroplatus fivehy Ratsoavina, Ranjanaharisoa, Glaw, Raselimanana, Rakotoarison, Vieites, Hawlitschek, Vences, & Scherz, 2020
Uroplatus fotsivava Ratsoavina, Gehring, Scherz, Vieites, Glaw & Vences, 2017
Uroplatus giganteus Glaw, Kosuch, Henkel, Sound & , 2006 – giant leaf-tail gecko
Uroplatus guentheri Mocquard, 1908 – Günther's leaf-tail gecko
Uroplatus henkeli Böhme & Ibisch, 1990 – frilled leaf-tail gecko
Uroplatus kelirambo Ratsoavina, Gehring, Scherz, Vieites, Glaw & Vences, 2017
Uroplatus lineatus (A.M.C. Duméril & Bibron, 1836) – lined leaf-tail gecko
Uroplatus malahelo Nussbaum & , 1994
Uroplatus malama Nussbaum & Raxworthy, 1995
Uroplatus phantasticus (Boulenger, 1888) – satanic leaf-tail gecko
Uroplatus pietschmanni Böhle & Schönecker, 2003 – cork-bark leaf-tail gecko
Uroplatus sameiti Böhme & Ibisch, 1990
Uroplatus sikorae (Boettger, 1913) – mossy leaf-tail gecko

Nota bene: A binomial authority in parentheses indicates that the species was originally described in a genus other than Uroplatus.

References

Further reading
Duméril AMC (1806). Zoologie analytique, ou méthode naturelle de classification des animaux, rendue plus facile a l'aide de tableaux synoptiques. Paris: Allais. (Perronneau, printer). xxxii + 344 pp. (Uroplatus, new genus, p. 80). (in French).

External links

 et al. (2011). "A new leaf tailed gecko species from northern Madagascar with a preliminary assessment of molecular and morphological variability in the Uroplatus ebenaui group". Zootaxa 3022: 39–57. Preview
Uroplatus geckos photo pool at Flickr, including these two pictures of the animal resting on tree trunks:  and 
Uroplatus Information Centre containing details on taxonomy, morphology, ecology, and captive care of Uroplatus species.
Watch more flat-tailed gecko (Uroplatus) video clips from the BBC archive on Wildlife Finder
Unique video detailing typical satanic leaf tailed gecko chasing behaviour

 
Lizard genera
Geckos of Africa
Endemic fauna of Madagascar
Taxa named by André Marie Constant Duméril